Bobbos is an Egyptian film released in 2009.

Plot
A businessman, stuck in the credit crunch, falls in love with a businesswoman who is in turn stuck in the credit crunch.

Cast
 Adel Emam as  Mohsen Hendawi
 Yousra as Mohga 
  Ezzat Abou Aouf as Nizam 
  Hassan Hosny as Abdel Monsef
  Ashraf Abdel Baqi as Raafat
  May Kassab as Tahany

Reception
The film was the subject of some criticism as being over-reliant on sexual innuendo.

References

2009 films
2000s Arabic-language films
Films set in Egypt
2009 comedy films
Egyptian comedy films